Vinokurov, Evgeny (born 6 October 1975) is a Russian economist, currently serving as the Chief Economist at Eurasian Development Bank and the Eurasian Fund for Stabilization and Development (EFSD). His research is in macro- and microeconomics, regional integration, global financial and economic architecture and international organizations.

He was educated at the universities of Kaliningrad, Göttingen, Grenoble and Moscow. He holds a Ph.D. (doktor nauk) in economy from the Institute of World Economy and International Relations (IMEMO) of the Russian Academy of Sciences, Moscow; and a Ph.D. from Pierre Mendes-France University (Grenoble II). After several years of experience in applied economy research projects at the Centre for European Policy Studies (CEPS), Catholic University of Leuven and the University of Jena he proceeded to working with the Eurasian Development Bank (EDB), being responsible for macro- and microeconomic analysis in particular, as well as the development bank's nascent research program.

Founding director of the EDB Centre for Integration Studies since 2011 until 2018. Over these years, EDB Centre for Integration Studies has published 50 reports on such issues as Eurasian integration, macroeconomics, investments, trade, cross-border infrastructure, labour migration and remittances, and the public perception of integration. All of the Centre’s reports are publicly available, open-access resources.

Since 2018 Vinokurov is the Chief Economist of the Eurasian Fund for Stabilization and Development. Simultaneously, since 2020 he is Chief Economist at the Eurasian Development Bank. The EFSD primarily provides budget and balance of payment support loans as well as large-scale infrastructure investment loans to its member states. The Chief Economist Group provides research in macro- and microeconomic issues with the focus on macroeconomic stability, fiscal sustainability, and debt sustainability of the EFSD member states. It also covers global and regional economic trends and various issues related to the global economic and financial architecture.

Vinokurov is the author and editor of 19 books, and a member of such professional bodies as International Studies Association and the American Economic Association. Professor of the Russian Academy of Sciences. Member of the Russian Council for International Affairs.

Academic Interests
He devoted several years to studying enclaves and exclaves. The main research findings are reflected in the books "A Theory of Enclaves", "Kaliningrad: Enclaves and Economic Integration", and "Adapting to European Integration? The Case of the Russian Exclave Kaliningrad". "A Theory of Enclaves" was also published in Russian. The study is built on the analysis of an extensive database that covers over 280 enclaves and exclaves. Enclaves are a fairly frequent phenomenon. The role of the enclaves as a generator of conflicts between motherland and surrounding states (e.g., Britain and Spain in the case of Gibraltar, Russia and the European Union in the case of Kaliningrad, Spain and Morocco in the case of Ceuta and Melilla) is of particular interest. A theory of enclaves provides the answers to two fundamental questions: what factors determine the enclaves' sovereign belonging (ethnic composition of the population) and what economic policies can ensure their successful sustainable economic development (economic openness).

Starting from 2003, Vinokurov has been engaged in studying economic and political integration. His interest in the Russian-European vector led to the publication of the book "The CIS, the EU, and Russia: The Challenges of Integration". Since 2006, while working in the EDB, Vinokurov focused on the issues of economic integration in the post-Soviet space and Eurasia. In 2007 Vinokurov became the Editorial Board member of the International Journal of Economic Policy in Emerging Economies. In 2008 he launched and became the editor of the EDB Eurasian Integration Yearbook (in English) and the quarterly research and analytical Journal of Eurasian Economic Integration (in Russian), published by the EDB until 2013 and 2015, respectively.

In 2009 he headed the international research group and published the EDB System of Indicators for the Eurasian Integration (SIEI), a complex system of comprehensive monitoring of statistics and dynamics of regional integration in the CIS region with the use of a specialized economic toolkit. Together with A. Libman they also developed a theory of holding-together regionalism to explain the patterns of regional re-integration processes (relevant for the explanation of integration patterns not only in the post-Soviet space but also in Africa and some other regions).

His research focused on integration processes on the Eurasian continent, spanning the European Union, the Eurasian Economic Union, Central Asia, Eastern Asia, and South Asia. In a nutshell, it provides a coherent view of Eurasian continental integration. The concept of Eurasian continental integration was the subject of the book "Eurasian Integration: Challenges of Transcontinental Regionalism", written together with A. Libman.

"Re-Evaluating Regional Organizations: Behind the Smokescreen of Official Mandates", was also co-authored with A. Libman and published by Palgrave Macmillan in 2017. It introduces the new database of 62 regional organizations with up to 130 various parameters for each one of them. This monograph pursues two research questions: first, why do regional organizations demonstrate such remarkable resilience even when they do not achieve their declared goals? Second, what factors actually determine the goal-setting and how do they evolve over the life of the regional organization?

“Introduction to the Eurasian Economic Union”, was published by Palgrave Macmillan in 2018. It represents a concise survey of various aspects of the functioning of the EAEU – from its history and institutions to the analysis of the common markets and the external economic relations. “One Eurasia or Many? Regional Interconnections and Connectivity Projects on the Eurasian Continent”, a book on the institutional cooperation setting and connectivity across the Eurasian continent, was written together with A. Libman and published by George Washington University in 2021.

Participation in International Congresses and Conferences
 Annual St. Petersburg International Economic Forum
 Valdai Club
 Regular ICCEES congresses
 Annual EDB International Conference on Eurasian Integration
 Astana Economic Forum
 Emerging Markets Forum
Annual meetings of the World Bank and the IMF

Publications

Books 
Libman A., Vinokurov E. (2021) One Eurasia or Many? Regional Interconnections and Connectivity Projects on the Eurasian Continent. — Washington DC: The George Washington University, Central Asia Program. ISBN 978-0-578-86820-2.
Vinokurov E. (2018) Introduction to the Eurasian Economic Union. Basingstoke and New York: Palgrave Macmillan.
Vinokurov E., Libman A. (2017) Re-Evaluating Regional Organizations: Behind the Smokescreen of Official Mandates. Basingstoke and New York: Palgrave Macmillan.
Vinokurov E., Kulik S., Spartak A., Chernyshev S.,  Yurgens I. (2015) The Conflict of Two Integrations. Moscow: Ekon-Inform. In Russian.
Vinokurov E. (ed.) (2014) System of Indicators of Eurasian Integration II. St. Petersburg: EDB.
Vinokurov E. (ed.) (2013) EDB Eurasian Integration Yearbook 2013. Almaty: EDB.
Vinokurov E., Libman A. (2012) Eurasian Integration: Challenges of Transcontinental Regionalism. Basingstoke and New York: Palgrave Macmillan.
Libman A., Vinokurov E. (2012) Holding-Together Regionalism: Twenty Years of the Post-Soviet Integration. Basingstoke and New York: Palgrave Macmillan.
Vinokurov E., Libman A. (2012) Еurasian Continental Integration. St. Petersburg: EDB. In Russian.
Vinokurov E. (ed.) (2012) EDB Eurasian Integration Yearbook 2012. Almaty: EDB.
Vinokurov E. (ed.) (2011) EDB Eurasian Integration Yearbook 2011. Almaty: EDB.
Vinokurov E. (ed.) (2010) EDB Eurasian Integration Yearbook 2010. Almaty: EDB.
Vinokurov E. (ed.) (2009) The System of Indicators of Eurasian Integration. Almaty: EDB.
Vinokurov E. (ed.) (2009) EDB Eurasian Integration Yearbook 2009. Almaty: EDB.
Vinokurov E. (ed.) (2008) EDB Eurasian Integration Yearbook 2008. Almaty: EDB.
Gaenzle S., Muentel G., Vinokurov E. (eds.) (2008) Adapting to European Integration? The Case of the Russian Exclave Kaliningrad. Manchester: Manchester University Press.
Vinokurov E. (2007) A Theory of Enclaves. Lanham, MD: Lexington Books.
Vinokurov E. (2007) Kaliningrad: Enclaves and Economic Integration. Brussels: CEPS. 
Malfliet K., Verpoest L., Vinokurov E. (eds.) (2007) The CIS, the EU, and Russia: Challenges of Integration. London: Palgrave Macmillan.
Vinokurov E. (2002) Together with Kant. Philosophical Foundations of a Global World Order. Kaliningrad: KGU (in Russian).

Selected Papers and Reports 
Vinokurov E., Levenkov A. (2021) The Enlarged Global Financial Safety Net. Global Policy. Vol. 12, no. 1.
Vinokurov E. (2020) Interaction of Eurasian and international financial institutions. Post-Communist Economies. Vol. 33, no. 2-3.
Vinokurov E. (2019) The Belt and Road Initiative: A Russian Perspective. In: Kohli, H., Linn, J., Zucker L. (eds.) China's Belt and Road Initiative: Potential Transformation of Central Asia and the South Caucasus. SAGE Publications Inc.
Lissovolik Y., Vinokurov E. (2019) Extending BRICS to BRICS+: Potential for Development Finance, Connectivity, and Financial Stability. Area Development and Policy, 4(2): 117-133.
Libman A., Vinokurov E. (2018) Autocracies and Regional Integration: the Eurasian Case. Post-Communist Economies.
Vinokurov E., Tsukarev T. (2018) The Belt and Road Initiative and the Interests of Transit Countries: an Economic Assessment of Transport Corridors. Area Development and Policy, 3: 1: 93-113. 
Vinokurov E., Libman A. (2018) Eurasian Integration and its Institutions: Do They Serve to Provide Security in Eurasia? In: Bordachev T., Dutkiewicz P., Lukyanov F., Sakwa R. (eds.) Eurasia on the Edge. Lexington Books, Lanham, MD. 
Vinokurov E. (2017) The Eurasian Economic Union: Current State and Preliminary Results. Russian Journal of Economics. Vol. 3 (1): 54-70.
Vinokurov E. (2016) Unter Partnern. Ein nüchterner Blick auf die Eurasische Wirtschaftsunion. Osteuropa, 5: 129-140 (in German)
Vinokurov E. (2016) Eurasian Economic Union: A Sober Look. Voprosy Ekonomiki. No. 12
Vinokurov E., Libman A. (2014) Do Economic Crises Impede or Advance Regional Economic Integration in the Post-Soviet Space?. Post-Communist Economies. Vol. 26 (3): 341–358.
Vinokurov E. (2014) Emerging Eurasian Continental Integration: Trade, Investments, and Infrastructure. Global Journal of Emerging Market Economies. Vol. 6(1): 69-93.
Vinokurov E. (2014) A Mega Deal Amid a Relationship Crisis. Russia in Global Affairs. No. 4.
Libman A., Vinokurov E. (2012) Post-Soviet integration and the interaction of functional bureaucracies. Review of International Political Economy. Vol. 19(5): 867-894
Libman A., Vinokurov E. (2012) Eurasian Economic Union: Why Now? Will It Work? Is It Enough? Whitehead Journal of Diplomacy and International Relations. Summer issue.
Libman A., Vinokurov E. (2012) Regional Integration and Economic Convergence in the Post-Soviet Space: Experience of a Decade of Growth. Journal of Common Market Studies. Vol. 50. Number 1. pp. 112–128.
Libman A., Vinokurov E. (2011) Is it really different? Patterns of regionalisation in the post-Soviet Central Asia. Post-Communist Economies, 23 (4), pp. 469–492.
Vinokurov E., Libman A. (2010) Post-Soviet Regional Integration Trends: Results of Quantitative Analysis, Voprosy Economiki, July. 
Vinokurov E., Libman A., Maqsimchook N. (2010) Dynamika integracionnykh processov v Centralnoy Azii [The Dynamics of Integration Processes in Central Asia]. Journal of Eurasian Economic Integration. Vol. 2 (7): 5-32. (In Russian). 
Vinokurov E. Libman A. (2009) Systema indikatorov evraziyskoy integracii: osnovnye vyvody [The System of Indicators of Eurasian Integration: Main Findings], Journal of Eurasian Economic Integration, Vol. 4 (5): 38-57. (In Russian). 
Vinokurov E., Jadraliyev M., Shcherbanin Y. (2009). The EurAsEC Transport Corridors. EDB Sector Report no.5. April. Almaty: EDB.
Vinokurov E. (2009) Mutual Investment in The CIS Banking Sector, The Euromoney Central Asia & CEE Financial Markets Handbook 2009/10, Euromoney, pp. 4–9. 
Vinokurov E. (2008) The CIS Common Electric Power Market. EDB Industry Report no.3. Almaty: EDB. 
Vinokurov E. (2008) Nuclear Complexes of Russia and Kazakhstan: Prospects of Development and Cooperation. EDB Industry Report no.1. Almaty: EDB. 
Samson I., Lamande V., and Vinokurov E. (2004) Measuring Regional Economic Development in Russia: The Case of the Kaliningrad Oblast, in:  European Urban and Regional Studies, (11)1:71-8. 
Lamande V., Vinokurov E. (2003) Trade in Kaliningrad Oblast, Problems of Economic Transition, (46)6: 56-72.

References

External links
The Eurasian Fund for Stabilization and Development (EFSD) official website
Eurasian Development Bank official website 
The EDB Centre for Integration Studies' Reports
Journal of Eurasian Economic Integration (in Russian)
EDB Eurasian Integration Yearbook
EDB Industry research
 JCMS: Journal of Common Market Studies
 Post-Communist Economies
 Review of International Political Economy
 Evgeny Vinokurov's personal website

1975 births
Living people
People from Kaliningrad
Russian economists
Immanuel Kant Baltic Federal University alumni